My Scene: Jammin' in Jamaica is a 2004 American animated comedy film. It is the first My Scene film. It was sold together with the My Scene "Jammin' in Jamaica" dolls. When Madison and Urban Desire go to Jamaica for a contest, Barbie, Nolee and Chelsea raise money to go there too and support their friends, but once there, Barbie is jealous when she catches her boyfriend River spending time with Madison. The film was directed by Eric Fogel, who also directed The Barbie Diaries.

Plot summary
Madison is manager of a band called Urban Desire, which is made up of the four male characters. When the band wins a contest, they make a trip to Jamaica for the finals, but Barbie, Nolee, and Chelsea are left behind so they decide to raise the money to travel to Jamaica. After all the characters arrive in Jamaica, Barbie feels left out as her boyfriend, the lead guitarist, begins spending more time with Madison. This causes a rift between the friends but is eventually resolved.

Cast
 Kelly Sheridan as Barbie and Lexi
 Nicole Bouma as Chelsea
 Tegan Moss as Nolee and Lucy
 Kathleen Barr as Madison and Forture Star Girl
 Meghan Black as Delancey
 Alessandro Juliani as River, Rhys, Ursa, and Treelo
 Shane Meier as Ellis and Baby Bear
 Mark Hildreth as Sutton, Hand, Cold, and Rhys' Dad
 Kirby Morrow as Hudson and Alan
 Nell Innes as Tyson

Music
Urban Desire cover two songs: "Spontaneous Combustion" by The Fuzz, and "Going Down In Flames" by Hidell. Both songs were censored at times to make them more child appropriate for the film. There are also two songs by Leslie Mills in the film, which are "Radiowave" and "Making My Way". "Making My Way" was also in Barbie and the Three Musketeers, which was released in 2009.

Reception
My Scene: Jammin' in Jamaica earned positive reviews from critics.

References

External links
 

2000s American animated films
2004 animated films
2004 direct-to-video films
2004 films
American direct-to-video films
American animated films
Barbie films
Direct-to-video animated films
Films set in Jamaica
2000s English-language films
Films directed by Eric Fogel